Diego Cristián Nelson Díaz Núñez (born 2 May 1996) is a Chilean footballer who currently last played for Chilean Segunda División side Independiente de Cauquenes as a defender.

Personal life
He is the twin brother of the professional footballer Luis Felipe Díaz. They have played for the same football club four times: Curicó Unido (2013–17), Palestino (2017), Deportes Recoleta (2019) and Independiente de Cauquenes (2021).

References

External links
 
 Diego Díaz at playmakerstats.com (English version of ceroacero.es)

Living people
1996 births
Footballers from Santiago
Chilean footballers
Primera B de Chile players
Chilean Primera División players
Segunda División Profesional de Chile players
Curicó Unido footballers
Club Deportivo Palestino footballers
San Luis de Quillota footballers
Deportes Recoleta footballers
Deportes Concepción (Chile) footballers
Independiente de Cauquenes footballers
Association football defenders